Cleptometopus similis is a species of beetle in the family Cerambycidae. It was described by Gahan in 1895.

References

similis
Beetles described in 1895